Burmeton is a 2010 Burmese comedy-drama film, directed by Khin Maung Oo and Soe Thein Htut starring Yan Aung, Nay Toe, Htun Eaindra Bo and Thet Mon Myint.

Cast
Yan Aung as Tain Moe Khaung
Nay Toe as That Ti
Htun Eaindra Bo as Kalyar
Thet Mon Myint as Barani
Mos as Ko Aww
Myittar as Bo Tar
Aye Mya Phyu as child cast

References

2010 films
2010s Burmese-language films
Burmese comedy-drama films
Films shot in Myanmar